Ee Thanalil Ithiri Nerum is a 1985 Indian Malayalam film,  directed by P. G. Vishwambharan and produced by Hameed and K. T. Kunjumon. The film stars Mammootty, Rahman, Shobhana, Thilakan and Adoor Bhasi in the lead roles. The film has musical score by Shyam. Mohanlal's Balettan is loosely adapted from this film.

Cast
Mammootty as Vijayan
Shobhana as Soudamini 
Rahman as Ravi
Rohini as Leena Menon
Innocent as Pilla
Nedumudi Venu as Adv.Menon
Kaviyoor Ponnamma as Savithri
Sumithra as Soudamini's elder sister
Thilakan as Madhavan Master, Soudamini's father
Adoor Bhasi as Vijayan's uncle 
Venu Nagavalli as Doctor 
Baby Chaithanya as Vijayan's daughter

Synopsis

The story revolves around the life of Vijayan (Mammotty). His otherwise normal life is interrupted with the presence of a mysterious person named Thulsi. The repeated arrival of Thulsi causes great tension in his family life.

Soundtrack

References

External links
 

1985 films
1980s Malayalam-language films
Films directed by P. G. Viswambharan